Flirting with Danger is a 1934 American comedy adventure film directed by Vin Moore and starring Robert Armstrong, Edgar Kennedy and William Cagney (James Cagney's lookalike brother). The picture was released by Monogram Pictures and has a running time of 62 minutes.

Cast
Robert Armstrong as Bob Owens
Edgar Kennedy as Jimmy Pierson
William Cagney as William "Lucky" Davis
Maria Alba as Rosita
Marion Burns as Marian Leslie
Ernest Hilliard as James Dawson
Wilhelm von Brincken as Von Kruger  (credited as Wm. L. von Brincken)
Guy Usher as James E. Fenton
Gino Corrado as Captain Garcia
Edward Hearn as San Rico Plant Supervisor
Carol Tevis as Cecilia, Stuttering Blonde (uncredited)
 Frank Yaconelli as Spanish Man in Cafe (uncredited)
Margaret La Marr (uncredited)

References

External links

Still at gettyimages.com

1934 films
1930s adventure comedy films
American adventure comedy films
Films directed by Vin Moore
Monogram Pictures films
American black-and-white films
Films set in South America
1934 comedy films
1930s American films